Marco Del Prete (born 17 August 1965) is an Italian swimmer. He competed in the men's 200 metre breaststroke at the 1984 Summer Olympics.

References

External links
 

1965 births
Living people
Olympic swimmers of Italy
Swimmers at the 1984 Summer Olympics
Swimmers from Rome
Italian male breaststroke swimmers
20th-century Italian people